Qaleh Dezh or Qaleh-ye Dezh may refer to:
 Qaleh Dezh, Hormozgan
 Qaleh Dezh, Khuzestan
 Qaleh-ye Dezh, Kohgiluyeh and Boyer-Ahmad